Rallarsving was a Swedish television series. It was broadcast on ZTV for 20 episodes between 2005 and 2006.

The show followed Musse Hasselvall and Andreas Halldén around the world while trying different martial arts. These included Shooto, Kendo, Savate, Capoeira, Filipino martial arts, Thaiboxing and Boxing. Both Musse and Andreas had between them 30 years of experience in martial arts prior of filming the series, Musse in shooto and Andreas in Thai boxing.

During the show the two meet heavy weights within the martial arts as Peter Aerts, Ilonka Elmont, Remy Bonjasky, Benny Urquidez, Randy Couture, Bas Rutten, Nong Toom, Ernesto Hoost, Joachim Hansen, Mestre Cobra Mansa and Alvin Aguilar.

Season 1 
Episode 1
Holland - Kickboxing, Ilonka Elmont, Remy Bonjasky, Peter Aerts
Episode 2
Sweden - Pancrase
Japan - Shooto, Kendo
Episode 3
Japan - Shooto, Yuki Nakai, Rumina Sato, Shorinji Kempo
Sweden - Pancrase
Episode 4
Iceland - Glima, Judo
Episode 5
Sweden - Kickboxing, Jörgen Kruth, Shaolin Kung Fu, Ebba Lexmark, Hanna Sillén, Taidō
Episode 6
California - Jim Wagne, Benny Urquidez
Episode 7
California - Bas Rutten, Randy Couture
Arizona - Arizona Combat Sports, Joe Riggs
Episode 8
Finland - Submission Wrestling, Jomhod Kiatadisak
Episode 9
Thailand - Muay Thai, Parinya Charoenphol, Anuwat Kaewsamrit
Episode 10
Stockholm - Ernesto Hoost

Season 2 
Episode 1
Kazakhstan - Martin Lidberg
Episode 2
Gotland - BJJ, Vikings, Pernilla Johansson
Episode 3
France - Savate, Jeremy Decherchi, Fencing, Jérôme Jeannet, Fabrice Jeannet
Episode 4
Rio de Janeiro - Ricardo Vieira, Leo Negao, Brazilian Top Team, Mario Sperry
Episode 5
Brazil - Capoeira, Cobra Mansa, Capojitsu
Episode 6
Tunisia - Boxing, Lotfi Ayed, Karate
Episode 7
Norway - MMA, Joachim Hansen, Jon Olav Einemo, Thomas Hytten, Jeet Kun Do
Episode 8
Philippines - Eskrima, Kalis, Alvin Aguilar
Episode 9
Philippines - Doce Pares, Yaw Yan
Episode 10
Sweden - Thabo Motsieloa, Paolo Roberto, Bosse Ringholm, Omar Bouiche, Martin Lidberg, Jörgen Kruth, Ebba Lexmark, Hanna Sillén, Thomas Rasmussen, Bobby Rehman

External links 

Swedish reality television series